Kim Kyung-ja is a female former international table tennis player from South Korea.

Table tennis career
She won a silver medal at the 1981 World Table Tennis Championships in the Corbillon Cup (women's team event) with An Hae-sook, Hwang Nam-sook and Lee Soo-ja for South Korea.

See also
 List of World Table Tennis Championships medalists

References

South Korean female table tennis players
World Table Tennis Championships medalists
20th-century South Korean women